Jeana robiginosa is a moth of the family Hepialidae. It is endemic to Tasmania.

References

Moths described in 1939
Hepialidae